The 2012 Singapore ATP Challenger was a professional tennis tournament played on hard courts. It was the second edition of the tournament which was part of the 2012 ATP Challenger Tour. It took place in Singapore between February 27 and March 4, 2012.

Scott Lipsky and David Martin were the defending champions but decided not to participate. Kamil Čapkovič and Amir Weintraub won the title, defeating Hsieh Cheng-peng and Lee Hsin-han 6–4, 6–4 in the final.

Seeds

Draw

Draw

References

Singapore ATP Challenger - Doubles
2012 Doubles
2012 in Singaporean sport